Tivali Minsk is an ice hockey club based in Minsk, Belarus.

History 
Formed in 1946, this Minsk based hockey team went through several identity changes all the while playing amongst several hockey leagues in Europe. It went bankrupt in 2001. In 2003, the team was brought back under its traditional namesake, Dinamo Minsk.

Honors

Winners
Belarusian Extraliga Championship: 4
 1993, 1994, 1995, 2000

Vysshaya Liga Championship: 4
 1970, 1977, 1996, 1997

Runners Up
Belarusian Extraliga Championship: 2
 1996, 1997

Ice hockey teams in Belarus
Belarusian Extraleague teams
Sport in Minsk
Minsk
1996 establishments in Belarus
2001 disestablishments in Belarus
Eastern European Hockey League teams